Fair Township is an inactive township in Platte County, in the U.S. state of Missouri.

Fair Township was erected in 1876, and named for the fact that the county fair once was held within its borders.

References

Townships in Missouri
Townships in Platte County, Missouri